The first season of Vietnam's Got Talent, a Vietnamese reality television talent show, aired Sunday nights at 9:00PM (UTC+7) between December 18, 2011 and May 6, 2012 on VTV3 and MTV Vietnam. The show was based on the Got Talent series format that originated by Simon Cowell in the United Kingdom. Artist Thành Lộc was the first host to be announced. Shortly thereafter, Thúy Hạnh confirmed her role at the judges' table. Huy Tuấn was given the 3rd spot of the judges' table. The show was presented by Chi Bảo and Quyền Linh.

The show was primarily produced by Vietnam Television and BHD Corp, with additional broadcasting by MTV Vietnam. The performance shows were aired Sundays on VTV3 while result shows were aired on VTV2 the following Tuesday.

Summary
Vietnam's Got Talent is a talent show that features singers, dancers, magicians, comedians, martial-art players, performers with risky weapons/tools/elements, variety acts and other performers of all ages competing for a grand prize of 400,000,000 VND (approximately $20,000).

The first season ran for 26 episodes. The producers chose the top 360 auditioning acts for taped auditions. These were subsequently cut down to 140 by an additional round of auditions consisting of the traditional "Yes" and "No" vote by a panel of three judges. The judges then chose their favourite 49 acts for advancement into the live semi-final rounds, from which the top two acts of each semi-final advanced to two final rounds consisting of 7 acts each, from which 2 acts per final round, one by televote and one by judges' vote, advanced to a grand finale.

Auditions
Auditions were initially held in 8 major cities. Afterwards, the producers announced that the auditions, dubbed Golden Chances, would be held in rural areas by way of a bus tour. The best two acts from each rural area and the best 5 acts from Ho Chi Minh City and Hanoi respectively advance to the second round of auditions.

Process

Producers' auditions
Televised producers' auditions for the first episode were held in Ho Chi Minh City, Long An, Cần Thơ, Buôn Ma Thuột, and Da Nang. Episode 2 was to feature auditions held in Hanoi, Lạng Sơn, Haiphong and Quảng Ninh. Untelevised producers' auditions were also held in nine rural areas; Bình Dương, Đồng Nai, Vũng Tàu, Tiền Giang, Bến Tre, Vĩnh Long, Hậu Giang, An Giang, Cà Mau, as well as Hanoi & Ho Chi Minh City. Due to disappointing viewing figures for the premiere episode, the airing of the second episode was replaced by the preliminary auditions.

Preliminary auditions

Judges' culling
140 acts advanced through the preliminary rounds to be culled by the judges, who chose 49 acts for advancement to the semi-final rounds. As announced, 3 additional acts were chosen as backups in the case of any semi-final qualifiers being disqualified or otherwise rendered unable to perform in the semi-finals.

Semi-final rounds

The acts are listed of chronological appearance.

1st Semi-final (March 4–6)
Celebrity performer: Thu Minh ("Đường cong")

Judges' vote (between Dòng thời gian & Khát vọng):
Thúy Hạnh: Dòng thời gian – "You managed to make a big impression on us and also gave both the audience and us a lot of surprises".
Thành Lộc: Khát vọng – Leaving the final decision up to Huy Tuấn.
Huy Tuấn: Dòng thời gian – "Your performance was excellent."

2nd Semi-final (March 11–13)
Celebrity performer: Anh Khang duet with Suboi ("Quê hương Việt Nam")

Judges' vote (between Nguyễn Trường Giang & Vũ Khánh Vân):
Thúy Hạnh: Nguyễn Trường Giang – "I will give you another chance to prove whether or not you can do better than in the previous round."
Huy Tuấn: Vũ khánh Vân – "Your performance was excellent.", leaving the final decision up to Thành Lộc.
Thành Lộc: Nguyễn Trường Giang – "Your technical popping is very solid, professional and highly entertaining."

3rd Semi-final (March 18–20)
Celebrity performer: PAK Band

Judge's' vote (between Đinh Ngọc Hoàng & Nguyễn Thái Hoàng)
Thành Lộc: Đinh Ngọc Hoàng
Thúy Hạnh: Đinh Ngọc Hoàng
Huy Tuấn was not required to vote since a majority decision had already been reached, but nevertheless confirmed that he, too, had voted for Ngọc Hoàng

4th Semi-final (March 25–27)
Celebrity performer: Hà Okio

Judges' vote (between Nguyễn Đặng Đăng Khoa & Dương Mạnh Hòa)
Huy Tuấn: Nguyễn Đặng Đăng Khoa – "You do not merely imitate Michael's choreography, but use to tell your own stories."
Thúy Hạnh: Dương Mạnh Hòa – She could not make up her mind and therefore choose Dương Mạnh Hòa in order to leave the final decision up to Thành Lộc
Thành Lộc: Dương Mạnh Hòa – "You are a gifted director and you are great performing artist."

5th Semi-final (April 1–3)
Celebrity performer: 365 daband

Judge's vote (between Nghị lực & Mộc)
Thúy Hạnh: Nghị lực
Thành Lộc: Mộc
Huy Tuấn: Mộc

6th Semi-final (April 8–10)
Celebrity performer: Hiền Thục

Judges' vote (between & )

7th Semi-final (April 15–17)
Celebrity performer: Thanh Bui

Judges' vote (between Nguyễn Hương Thảo & Trần Thái Sơn)
Thành Lộc: Hương Thảo
Thúy Hạnh: Thái Sơn
Huy Tuấn: Hương Thảo

Final rounds
The Final rounds consisted of 14 acts from the semi-final rounds spread out over two shows aired on April 22 and 29, 2012.

Final round 1 (April 22)
The 1st final round was aired on April 22, 2012, filmed in BHD Studio in district 9 of Ho Chi Minh City.

Final round 2 (April 29)
The 1st final round was aired on April 29, 2012, filmed in BHD Studio in district 9 of Ho Chi Minh City.

Grand Finale
The Grand Finale consisted of the top 4 performance from the final rounds and was aired live on May 6, 2012 from Lan Anh stadium.

References

External links
List of broadcasts of Vietnam Television (VTV)

Vietnam's Got Talent on Facebook page

Vietnam's Got Talent
2010s Vietnamese television series
2011 Vietnamese television seasons
2012 Vietnamese television seasons